The 1906–07 season was Madrid Football Club's 5th season in existence. The club played some friendly matches. They also played in the Campeonato Regional de Madrid (Madrid Regional Championship) and the Copa del Rey. Madrid FC won both competitions for the third consecutive season, becoming the first club to achieve the feat. However, the results of the Campeonato de Madrid were later annulled by the Madrid Football Federation.

Friendlies

Competitions

Overview

Campeonato Regional de Madrid

Copa del Rey

Madrid Qualifying Tournament

Group stage

Final
Although intended to be a round-robin tournament, at the end of the group stage, Madrid FC and Club Vizcaya finished tied at 6 points. A tiebreaker final was contested on 30 March to determine the winner of the 1907 Copa del Rey.

References

External links
Realmadrid.com Official Site
International Friendlies of Real Madrid CF - Overview

Real Madrid
Real Madrid CF seasons